Lukas Lauko (born February 17, 1987) is a Slovak professional ice hockey player who played with HC Slovan Bratislava in the Slovak Extraliga.

References

External links

Living people
HC Slovan Bratislava players
Slovak ice hockey defencemen
1987 births
Ice hockey people from Bratislava